Brevirhabdus is a Gram-negative and aerobic genus of bacteria from the family of Rhodobacteraceae with one known species, Brevirhabdus pacifica. B. pacifica has been isolated from deep-sea sediments from a hydrothermal vent field from the East Pacific Rise

References

Rhodobacteraceae
Bacteria genera
Monotypic bacteria genera